Cryptoblabes myosticta is a species of snout moth in the genus Cryptoblabes. It was described by George Hampson in 1903. It is found in India.

References

Moths described in 1903
Cryptoblabini